Seven ships of the Brazilian Navy have been named  Riachuelo after the main naval battle fought by the Empire of Brazil in the Paraguayan War.

, later renamed Marquês de Caxias.

, of the Imperial Brazilian Navy. (1883–1910)
, cancelled project. (1914)
(1943–1968)
(1977–1997)
(2018–present)

References

Brazilian Navy ship names